Eucalyptus × balanopelex is a mallee that is endemic to a small area of the south-west of Western Australia. It has smooth bark, broadly lance-shaped adult leaves, flower buds in groups of seven, creamy-white flowers and hemispherical fruit. It is thought to be a hybrid between E. kessellii subsp. eugnosta and E. semiglobosa.

Description
It has smooth pale grey to brownish bark throughout. The adult leaves are usually the same glossy green on both side and have a dense network of veins.

The Australian Plant Census lists this species as a natural hybrid between E. kessellii subsp. eugnosta and E. semiglobosa.

Taxonomy and naming
Eucalyptus × balanopelex was first formally described in 1992 as Eucalyptus balanopelex by Lawrie Johnston and Ken Hill who published the description in the journal Telopea. The specific epithet (balanopelex) is derived from the Ancient Greek words balanos meaning "acorn" or "barnacle", and pelex meaning "a helmet", referring to the shape of the operculum.

Distribution and habitat
This eucalypt grows on a low-lying sandplain near Esperance.

In 2012, Dean Nicolle and Malcolm French proposed that E. balanopelex is a hybrid of E. kessellii subsp. eugnosta and E. semiglobosa and should be delisted from the list of threatened flora. It is no longer listed by FloraBase.

See also
List of Eucalyptus species

References

Eucalypts of Western Australia
balanopelex
Myrtales of Australia
Plants described in 1992
Taxa named by Lawrence Alexander Sidney Johnson
Plant nothospecies
Taxa named by Ken Hill (botanist)